Greenbank is a surname. Notable people with the surname include:

Amy Greenbank, Australian journalist
Harry Greenbank (1865–1899), English writer and dramatist
Kelly Greenbank (born 1955), Canadian-born Austrian ice hockey player
Luke Greenbank (born 1997), British swimmer
Percy Greenbank (1878–1968), English lyricist